The Ministry of Justice and Public Security, previously known as Ministry of Justice and Ministry of Justice and Citizenship, is a cabinet-level federal ministry in Brazil. The current minister is Flávio Dino.

Divisions and programs
The Brazilian National Archives.
The Administrative Council for Economic Defense (CADE), which regulates economic power and its abuse.
The Brazilian advisory rating system (ClassInd), which establishes the ratings for movies, TV shows, and video games within Brazil.
The Federal Police of Brazil, which provides law enforcement of federal laws, acting as a Federal Judicial Police. It has juristicion in interstate and/or international cases, acting in cooperation with a US federal law enforcement agency, for example: the FBI and the DEA.
The Federal Highway Police (DPRF), which provides the law enforcement of the federal highways.
The Federal Railroad Police (PFF), which provides the law enforcement of the federal railroads.
The Fundação Nacional do Índio (FUNAI), a governmental protection agency for amerindian interests and their culture.

See also
 List of Ministers of Justice of Brazil
 Attorney General of Brazil
 Justice ministry
 Politics of Brazil
 Prosecutor General of Brazil
 Public Prosecutor's Office of Brazil
 FUNAI
 Other ministries of Justice

References

External links
 
 

Government ministries of Brazil
Justice ministries
Organizations established in 1822
1822 establishments in Brazil
Government agencies established in the 1820s
Law of Brazil